Peter Robert McShannic is a former Major League Baseball player. He played for the Pittsburgh Alleghenys of the National League during the 1888 baseball season.

External links

1864 births
1946 deaths
Major League Baseball third basemen
Pittsburgh Alleghenys players
19th-century baseball players
Chattanooga Lookouts players
St. Paul Freezers players
Altoona Mountain Cities players
Binghamton Crickets (1880s) players
Zanesville Kickapoos players
Hamilton Hams players
Saginaw-Bay City Hyphens players
Baseball players from Pennsylvania